Scott Morgan (born 22 March 1975) is an English retired semi-professional footballer who played as a defender. He made one appearance in the Football League for Brentford and had a long career in semi-professional football in England, Ireland and Wales.

Club career

Brentford 
After beginning his career in the youth systems at West Ham United and Bournemouth, Morgan joined Second Division club Brentford in 1993. He made his professional debut in a 1–0 victory over Hartlepool United on 9 October 1993. Having made just three appearances, Morgan was released at the end of the 1993–94 season and his progress was hampered by a serious knee injury.

Dorchester Town 
After his release from Brentford, Morgan signed for Southern League Premier Division club Dorchester Town, who were managed by his father Stuart. He remained with the club until 1997 and disillusioned, quit football. Looking back in 2005, Morgan stated that he "hated" his time with the club and found it difficult being the manager's son.

Galway United 
Morgan returned to football in 1999, after receiving a phone call from former Dorchester Town teammate and Galway United manager Don O'Riordan. Morgan subsequently signed for the League of Ireland Premier Division strugglers and helped the club to stave off relegation during the 1999–00 season. He was also named captain. Morgan made 25 appearances and scored one goal during the 2000–01 season, but could not help the Tribesmen narrowly avoiding relegation for the second season in succession. He departed the club after the campaign, having made 49 appearances and scored one goal.

Barry Town 
Morgan joined reigning League of Wales champions Barry Town in July 2001. He made 40 appearances during the 2001–02 season and won the first silverware of his career, with a League of Wales and Welsh Cup double. He signed a new two-year contract in May 2002. Morgan made 27 league appearances and scored three goals during the 2002–03 season, once again winning the newly branded-Welsh Premier League and Welsh Cup double. With years of overspending crippling the club, Morgan and most of the squad departed Barry in August 2003. Morgan made 61 league appearances and scored three goals during his two years with the club.

Forest Green Rovers 
After interest from Southern League Premier Division club Newport County, Morgan signed for Conference club Forest Green Rovers on a two-year deal in August 2003. Morgan played in the Green's first seven games of the season, before a head-butting incident with stand-in captain Martin Foster in a 2–1 defeat to Halifax Town in late September saw him sacked by the club.

Newport County 
Morgan joined Southern League Premier Division club Newport County on a temporary contract on 21 October 2003. He made 14 appearances and scored two goals during the 2003–04 season. Morgan made 40 appearances and scored one goal for the struggling team and departed the club at the end of the campaign, having been looking for a move away from Spytty Park since January 2005.

Return to Dorchester Town 
Morgan returned to Dorchester Town in May 2005 and signed a two-year contract. Now playing Conference South football with the Magpies, Morgan made 32 appearances and scored one goal during the 2005–06 season. His performances saw him jointly-awarded the club's Player of the Year award with centre back partner Alex Browne. Morgan made 30 league appearances and scored one goal during the 2006–07 season. He agreed a new one-year deal in May 2007, but quit the club two months later, citing difficulties with the club's new full-time training regime.

Personal life 
Morgan is a member of the Morgan footballing family, which includes Stuart Morgan (his father), Ceri Morgan and Eli Morgan.

Career statistics

Honours 
Barry Town
 Welsh Premier League (2): 2001–02, 2002–03
 Welsh Cup (2): 2001–02, 2002–03

Individual

 Dorchester Town Player of the Year (1): 2005–06

References

External links 
 Scott Morgan at Soccerbase

1975 births
Living people
English footballers
Brentford F.C. players
English Football League players
Sportspeople from Colchester
Association football fullbacks
Association football central defenders
West Ham United F.C. players
AFC Bournemouth players
Dorchester Town F.C. players
Southern Football League players
Galway United F.C. (1937–2011) players
League of Ireland players
Barry Town United F.C. players
Forest Green Rovers F.C. players
National League (English football) players
Newport County A.F.C. players
English expatriate footballers
English expatriate sportspeople in Ireland